Jessica Xue, also known as Xue Yun Fang (born January 12, 1994) is a Chinese radio host, model and beauty pageant titleholder who was crowned as Miss Universe China in 2015 and represented her country at the Miss Universe 2015 pageant.

Personal life
Jessica Xue was born in Shenzhen, Guangdong, China. She used to works as a radio host and at present she is TV host for the Shenzhen TV. Prior to competing at the Miss Universe China 2015 pageant, she became the Miss Universe China delegate from Guangdong province.

Miss Universe China 2015
Xue was crowned Miss Universe China 2015 by Karen Hu, Miss Universe China 2014. The pageant was held on August 29, 2015, and was held at the Shanghai Pudong Shangri-La Hotel Ballroom.

As Miss China 2015, Xue took part the Miss Universe China 2015 pageant in China, Shanghai on August 29, 2015. However, at the last spot evening gown competition of Miss Universe China 2015, she did great exciting all the viewers spectators by swaying her evening gown continue, but all on a sudden she fell down during cat walk by swaying her evening gown.

References

External links
 Official Miss China website

1994 births
Living people
Chinese beauty pageant winners
Miss Universe 2015 contestants
People from Shenzhen
Guangzhou University alumni